Crassula tillaea is a succulent plant known by its common names mossy stonecrop and moss pygmyweed. It is a small fleshy plant growing only a few centimeters in height. It is green when new and gradually turns orange and then deep red when mature. It has tiny triangular pointed leaves only a few millimeters long. A tiny flower or pair of flowers grows between each oppositely-arranged pair of leaves; the flowers are about two millimeters in length and width. The fruit is a minute follicle containing one or two seeds. This plant is native to Eurasia, particularly the Mediterranean Basin, but is known in other regions as an introduced species.

References

External links
Jepson Manual Treatment
USDA Plants Profile
Photo gallery

tillaea
Flora of Malta